The Germany Men's Under-19 National Floorball Team is the men's under-19 national floorball team of the Germany, and a member of the International Floorball Federation. The team is composed of the best German floorball players under the age of 19. The German under-19 men's team is currently ranked 6th in the world at floorball, and advanced from the B-Division at the most recent U-19 World Floorball Championships.

The team is currently prepping for the 2023 U-19 World Floorball Championship.

All-time world championships results

Roster 
As of August 1, 2021

Team Staff 
Head Coach - Thomas Berger 

Coach - Tilmann Gebhardt 

Coach - Sascha Marquardt 

Goalkeeper Coach - Pavel Lubentsov 

Athletic Trainer - Michael Rothgeber 

Team Official - Raimund Kalytta 

Equipment Manager - Sven Heins

Head-to-Head International Records

References 

Floorball in Germany
Men's national floorball teams